Magdalena Nieć  is a Polish actress. She graduated PWST in Wrocław. Now she is an actress of Teatr Współczesny in Warsaw. She played also in some Polish films (Sabina (1998), Bezmiar sprawiedliwości (2006) ) .

Tv series and film 
 1998: Sabina (film)
 2005: Szanse finanse
 2005: Wielkie ucieczki
 2006: Bezmiar sprawiedliwości
 2007: Pogoda na piątek
 2008: Jak żyć
 2008: Na dobre i na złe
 2009-2010: Na Wspólnej – Oksana Krajewska
 2008: Gra o Nobla – Danuta Wałęsa
 2008-2009: Przeznaczenie – komisarz Anna
 2010: Ojciec Mateusz – żona Adama Gorczycy
 2010: Majka – Danuta
2011: Unia Serc – Anna
2012: Prawo Agaty – Beata Kowerska, ciotka Julii (odc. 26)
2013: 2XL – Wanda Madejska (odc. 6)
2014: Za niebieskimi drzwiami (film fabularny)  – Magdalena Borska, mama Łukasza / głównego bohatera

Theatre 

 Ludowy Theatre in Cracow, Poland
 2014: Między płotem a kowadłem

 Kamienica Theatre in Warsaw, Poland
 2013: Dzieci z Dworca zoo

 Capitol Theatre in Warsaw
 2010: Wszystko o kobietach

 Współczesny Theatre in Warsaw
 2011: "Gran operita"
 2008: Proces – jako żona woźnego
 2008: To idzie młodość – Marika

 Ludowy Theatre in Cracow
 1999: Symfoniczna wazelina 1917 – jako Anna Blume
 2000: Opowieści jedenastu katów – jako Madame Lulu
 2000: Wesele – jako Zosia
 2001: Kafka – jako Felice
 2002: Prywatna klinika – jako Anna
 2002: Księżniczka Turandot – jako Turandot
 2003: Betlejem-misterium na Boże... – jako Matka
 2003: Przygody Sindbada Żeglarza – jako Królewna
 2004: Królowa Śniegu – jako Wróżka
 2004: Biznes – jako Hilda Bigley
 2005: Proces – jako Leni
 2006: Stara kobieta wysiaduje – jako Lachezis
 2006: Paw królowej – jako Anna Przesik
 2006: Wszystko o kobietach – jako Aktorka I: Magda, Nina, Krysia, Mimi, Rozalia
 2007: Niezwykły dom Pana A., czyli.. – jako Mama

 Współczesny Theatre in Wrocław im. Wiercińskiego
 1996: Komedia sytuacyjna – jako Doris Summerskill

'Polski Theatre in Bielsko-Biała, Poland:
 1994: Śluby panieńskie – jako Klara
 1995: Balladyna – jako Balladyna
 1995: Kubuś i jego pan – jako Agata
 1995: Poskromienie złośnicy –  jako Katarzyna
 1996: Okno na parlament – jako Jane Worthington
 1997: Zemsta – jako Podstolina
 1998: Moralność pani Dulskiej – jako Mela
 1998: Mały Książę – jako Róża; Żmija; Lis
 1998: Słupnik – jako Maja
 1998: Mistrz i Małgorzata – jako Asystentka, Natasza, Nisa
 1999: Anhelli – jako Anioł II; Wygnaniec
 1999: Toast na cześć kobiet – jako Helena Iwanowna Popowa

dubbing 
 1995-1996: Karypel kontra groszki – głosy postaci animowanych
 1998-2003: Między nami bocianami – głosy postaci animowanych

References

Polish actresses
Living people
1972 births